Pease Bay is a bay in the Scottish Borders area of Scotland, close to the border with East Lothian as well as Cockburnspath, Cove and Dunglass. The area is notable as a holiday destination, for surfing in Scotland, and also for the large static caravan park at the bottom of the bay.

Pease Dean
Pease Dean is a Scottish Wildlife Trust reserve. It consists of Pease Burn and Tower Burn.

Pease Bridge
Pease Bridge was opened in 1786. At that time it was the highest bridge in the world. Comprising four tall arches, it is 300 ft (91.5m) long, 16 ft(4.9m) wide, and 139 ft(39.6m) high. The parapet is surmounted by an iron railing.
SCRAN image:Pease Bridge
RCAHMS: Pease Bridge, Pease Burn, Pease Dean
A1107: Reopening of Pease Bridge, 2004.

See also
Site of Special Scientific Interest SSSI
Sir Walter Scott Way
List of places in the Scottish Borders
List of places in Scotland

External links
Scottish Environment Protection Agency (SEPA) report on bathing water quality
Edinburgh Uni School of Geosciences, Pease Bay to Cove Harbour field trip
Scottish Natural Heritage (SNH) Report, Survey for Pease Bay Coast SSSI
Edinburgh Geological Society, Pease Bay to Cove

Bays of Scotland
Landforms of the Scottish Borders
Surfing locations in Scotland